The Thunder Bay Regional Health Sciences Foundation (Health Sciences Foundation) is a not-for-profit organization created to raise funds to support health care in Northwestern Ontario. Donations to the Health Sciences Foundation support new medical equipment, technology and a variety of treatment programs in areas of health care including paediatrics, renal, emergency and others, with all funds remaining in Northwestern Ontario. The Health Science Foundation's mission statement is "To raise funds to support excellence in health care for the people of Northwestern Ontario."

On April 1, 2008, it was combined with the Northern Cancer Research Foundation.

The Health Sciences Foundation supports three specialty funds:

The Northern Cancer Fund raises funds that are dedicated to supporting cancer care in Northwestern Ontario. The Northern Cancer Fund continues the work of the former Northern Cancer Research Foundation and supports the initiatives of the Linda Buchan Centre for Breast Screening and Assessment, the TBayTel Tamarack House, and smoking cessation programs for patients across Northwestern Ontario;
The Northern Cardiac Fund raises funds that are dedicated to supporting cardiac care in Northwestern Ontario, and
The Health Sciences Discovery Fund raises funds that are dedicated to support medical research across Northwestern Ontario.

On October 16, 2019, the Health Sciences Foundation announced the launch of its second-largest campaign to date, the Our Hearts at Home Cardivascular Campaign. The program would follow a one-program, two-sites model of care in partnership with University Health Network’s (UHN) Peter Munk Cardiac Centre in Toronto.

References

External links
 Thunder Bay Regional Health Sciences Foundation

Organizations based in Thunder Bay